Sher Bahadur Kunwor is a Nepali politician who is currently serving as the Minister of Labour, Employment and Social Security in the ruling coalition led by Prime Minister and Nepali Congress President Sher Bahadur Deuba. He is currently a member of the CPN (Unified Socialist).

Kunwar is taken as one of the brave leaders as he had filed candidacy in the 2008 Constituent Assembly election from Achham 1 when Bhim Rawal was afraid due to Maoist upraise in his constituency. He was elected from the Achham 1 constituency, winning 21631 votes. He is the current Member of   National Assembly of Nepal representing Sudurpaschim Pradesh.

References

Living people
Communist Party of Nepal (Unified Socialist) politicians
Members of the National Assembly (Nepal)
Nepal Communist Party (NCP) politicians
Members of the 1st Nepalese Constituent Assembly
Nepal MPs 2022–present
1966 births